The 2016 Liège–Bastogne–Liège was a one-day classic cycling race that took place on 24 April 2016. It was the fourth cycling monument of the 2016 season and was the thirteenth event of the 2016 UCI World Tour. The race came at the end of the spring classics season.

The race took place on a  route that started in Liège, headed to Bastogne and returned to Liège before ending in Ans. The route included many hills, especially in the final , which were the principal difficulty in the race. Originally the race was scheduled to take place on a  route, but due to the bad weather conditions the race was shortened. Alejandro Valverde was the defending champion and was among the favourites for victory, following his victory in La Flèche Wallonne the previous week.

The decisive move in the race came in the final classified climb of the day, the Côte de la Rue Naniot, where Michael Albasini initiated a four-man breakaway. The group contested the sprint for victory, with Wout Poels (Team Sky) winning ahead of Albasini and 's Rui Costa.

Route 

Although the majority of the route was the same as in previous years, there were some significant changes to the route compared to the 2015 edition. Instead, a new climb was inserted between the Côte de San Nicolas and the finish line in Ans. This climb, the Côte de la Rue Naniot, was in the suburbs of Liège and was a steep, straight, cobbled road.

In general, the route took the riders from the start in Liège south to Bastogne. With  covered, the route turned to the north and took the riders back to Liège. The race finished in Ans, just to the west of Liège.

Liège–Bastogne–Liège is the last of the three Ardennes classics and is the closing race of the spring classics season. The Ardennes classics are three races that cover courses with many short, steep hills. It is also one of the so-called monuments of the sport, considered to be the most prestigious in cycling. The principal difficulty in the 2016 Liège–Bastogne–Liège came from the ten classified climbs, most of which came in the last part of the race. There was one climb, the Côte de la Roche-en-Ardenne, before the peloton reached Bastogne. After the turn, there was another climb, the Côte de Saint-Roch, before the most difficult section of the race, the final . This included the Côte de Wanne, the Côte de la Haute-Levée, the Col du Rosier and the Col du Maquisard. With  remaining, the riders came to the Côte de La Redoute, described by Cyclingnews.com as the race's "most hallowed site". This is a  climb at an average gradient of 8.9%. Around  later came the  Côte de la Roche-aux-Faucons –  at 11% – and then the descent into the outskirts of Liège. In the final  were two climbs: the Côte de San Nicolas –  at 8.6% – and the Côte de la Rue Naniot. The race then finished with a final , unclassified climb to the finish line in Ans.

There was a last-minute route change due to the weather conditions. No climbing was altered, but a section of the route between Liège and the day's first climb was changed to avoid snow-affected areas.

Teams 
The race organisers invited 25 teams to participate in the 2016 Liège–Bastogne–Liège. As it is a UCI World Tour event, all 18 WorldTeams were invited automatically and were obliged to send a squad. An additional seven UCI Professional Continental teams were given wildcard entries. These included three French teams (and ), two Belgian teams ( and ), a Dutch team and a German team. Each team was entitled to enter eight riders, so the start list included 200 riders.

Pre-race favourites 

The principal favourite for victory in the race was the defending champion, 's Alejandro Valverde. Valverde had won the race on three previous occasions – in 2006, 2008 and 2015. In 2006 and 2015 he had also won La Flèche Wallonne; after winning the 2016 edition of that race earlier in the week, Valverde was seeking to win an unprecedented third "Ardennes double". Valverde had the advantage of climbing better than most sprinters and sprinting better than most climbers.

Two of the main challengers to Valverde came from the  team. These were Dan Martin, the 2013 champion, and Julian Alaphilippe, who had been second behind Valverde in 2015; they had finished second and third behind Valverde on the Mur de Huy in La Flèche Wallonne the previous week. Martin said after that race that he expected to gain a greater tactical advantage by having two riders in Liège–Bastogne–Liège. Other potential winners included three  riders (the 2014 champion, Simon Gerrans, along with Simon Yates and Adam Yates), 's Joaquim Rodríguez, 's Michał Kwiatkowski and Wout Poels (who were supported by the reigning Tour de France champion, Chris Froome) and Enrico Gasparotto, who had won the Amstel Gold Race the previous Sunday and performed strongly in La Flèche Wallonne as well.

Race summary 

The race took place in cold, snowy conditions, with low visibility in the early part of the race. By the time the breakaway formed, an hour into the day's racing, 's Julien Loubet had already abandoned; he was one of 46 riders not to finish the race. The breakaway was initially composed of seven riders: Paolo Tiralongo, Alessandro De Marchi (BMC), Pavel Brutt (Tinkoff), Nicolas Edet (Cofidis), Jérémy Roy, Thomas De Gendt (Lotto–Soudal) and Cesare Benedetti. With  completed, 's Vegard Stake Laengen bridged across from the peloton to the breakaway; the eight-man group built a lead that reached nine minutes. The peloton was controlled first by Etixx–Quick-Step and then by Movistar and the gap was reduced to four minutes by the Côte de Wanne, with  remaining.

Shortly afterwards, Chris Froome was involved in a minor crash, although he was quickly able to rejoin the peloton. By this point, the peloton was riding into a headwind, with the weather conditions changing repeatedly between rain and snow. On the Col de Rosier, with the gap reduced to around two minutes, Thomas Voeckler and Lilian Calmejane (both ), and Adam Yates attacked from the peloton, while De Marchi and Edet broke away from the rest of the leading group. Calmejane and Yates were unable to stay with Voeckler, who crossed the summit of the climb on his own. Shortly afterwards, Tony Gallopin crashed and was forced to abandon the race. Approaching the Col de la Redoute, De Gendt caught De Marchi and Edet to form a lead group of three riders, while the peloton – now just 30 seconds behind – caught Voeckler. Astana's Andriy Hrivko attacked on the climb and caught up with De Gendt, who had again been dropped by Edet and De Marchi.

The peloton caught the breakaway groups on the descent from the Côte de La Roche-aux-Faucons, with Etixx–Quick-Step driving the pace. On the approach to the Côte de Saint-Nicholas, Carlos Betancur (Movistar) attacked; there were then attacks from Kwiatkowski and Hrivko. With Betancur again attacking on the climb, Vincenzo Nibali (Astana) and Simon Gerrans were dropped. At the top of the climb, there were attacks from Romain Bardet, Diego Rosa (Astana) and Ilnur Zakarin (Katusha); they were brought back, however, by the foot of the final climb of the day, the Côte de la Rue Naniot, with the peloton now reduced to fewer than 30 riders.

The peloton was split by the steep gradient of the climb. After Julien Alaphilippe made a failed attempt to escape the group, Michael Albasini (Orica–GreenEDGE) attacked around half-way up and only Rui Costa, Samuel Sánchez (BMC) and Wout Poels (Sky) were able to follow. With  remaining, they had a five-second lead, but few of the riders in the chasing group had teammates with them, so there was no coordinated effort to close the gap. On the final ascent to the line, there were attacks from Albasini and Poels, although neither was able to get away from the group. Ilnur Zakarin attacked from the peloton, but was unable to come across to the leading group. Going around the final corner, with  remaining, Poels was the first to sprint. Albasini followed him but was unable to come past. Poels crossed the line first, with Albasini second and Costa third. Sánchez was four seconds behind in fourth, with Zakarin a further five seconds back in fifth. Warren Barguil was the first to finish from the chasing group, eleven seconds behind Poels.

Result

Post-race analysis

Reactions 

Poels's victory was his first ever in a one-day race. It was also the first ever victory in any of the cycling monuments for Team Sky and the first Liège–Bastogne–Liège victory by a Dutch rider in 28 years. Cyclingnews.com described it as the "biggest result of his career". Poels himself said that he had felt good all day and had been warm throughout, despite the weather; he joked that he "really liked" the Côte de la Rue Naniot. He suggested that he was improving as a rider following his move from Etixx–Quick-Step to Sky two years previously, especially in his ability to stay near the front of the peloton throughout the race.

Albasini was not originally Orica–GreenEDGE's leader; he inherited the role after Simon Gerrans was dropped towards the end of the race. He said that he thought he was the strongest of the four-man group that formed on the final climb and blamed a mistake for his failure to win: he said that he had chosen the wrong gearing for the sprint and was unable to match Poels's acceleration. He said that he had ridden "a good race" even though he had failed to win. Albasini's performance came at the end of a strong spring classics season for his team, following Mathew Hayman's victory at Paris–Roubaix two weeks previously. Costa, meanwhile, said "It was the toughest day on a bike that I can remember" and "when it's bad weather, my body seems to react well". He congratulated Poels, saying that he was stronger in the sprint.

Alejandro Valverde said that he had been mistaken in his belief that the Côte de la Rue Naniot would not be decisive. It was his worst performance in the race since 2012, but he said that he felt he was in strong form ahead of the Giro d'Italia. Dan Martin said that the weather conditions had forced the riders to ride in a conservative manner, since nobody could attack when it was so cold. Both he and Julian Alaphilippe blamed the weather for their failure to be in the final selection. Alaphilippe said "This is the first time in my life I had to do a race in such bad weather. We riders have a dog's life sometimes."

UCI World Tour standings 

In the season-long 2016 UCI World Tour competition, Peter Sagan (Tinkoff) remained in first place overall, 49 points ahead of his teammate Alberto Contador. Poels's victory earned him 100 points and moved him up to ninth place, while Ilnur Zakarin moved up to tenth. Spain moved back into the lead of the nations' standings and Tinkoff retained the lead of the teams' standings, although Sky were now within 100 points of the lead. Despite Barguil's sixth-place finish, Team Giant–Alpecin remained in last place in the team standings.

References

Sources

External links 
 

Liège–Bastogne–Liège
Liege-Bastogne-Liege
Liege-Bastogne-Liege
Liege-Bastogne-Liege